Dasht-e Ali (also Romanized as Dasht-e ‘Ālī) is a village in Bakesh-e Yek Rural District, in the Central District of Mamasani County, Fars Province, Iran. At the 2006 census, its population was 27, in 4 families.

References 

Populated places in Mamasani County